Leonie Krail (born 9 September 1986) is a Swiss former competitive ice dancer. With Oscar Peter, she is a three-time Swiss national champion (2006, 2008, 2009) and competed in the final segment at four ISU Championships – 2006 Europeans, 2008 Europeans, 2009 Europeans, and 2008 Worlds.

Earlier in her career, Krail competed with Marc Fausch. After Fausch quit, she was without a partner for six months and then teamed up with Oscar Peter, in 2003. Krail/Peter were coached by Natalia Linichuk and Gennadi Karponosov in Aston, Pennsylvania.

Programs 
(with Oscar Peter)

Competitive highlights

With Peter

With Fausch

References

External links
 
 

Swiss female ice dancers
1986 births
Living people
People from Emmental District